Ocal or OCAL may refer to:

 Öcal, Turkish surname
 Öçal, Turkish surname
 Open Clip Art Library